Terence Victor Strange (born 28 December 1932 in Oxford) is a former English cricketer. He was a right-handed batsman and right-arm fast bowler who played for Oxfordshire.

A right-arm fast bowler and tail-end right-handed batsman, Strange made his Minor Counties Championship debut for Oxfordshire during the 1953 season, and played 41 matches over 18 seasons. He made a single List A appearance, in 1970, his final season with the team. From the tail-end, he scored 2 not out with the bat, and took figures of 0-21 from 9 overs with the ball.

References

External links
 

1932 births
Living people
Cricketers from Oxford
English cricketers
Oxfordshire cricketers